Viktor Yakovlevich Stanitsyn (1897–1976) was a Soviet and Russian stage and film actor. He appeared in a number of Soviet era films including portraying Winston Churchill in The Lights of Baku (1950) as well as several other films.

Biography
Viktor was born on May 2 in 1897 in Yekaterinoslav (now — Dnipro, Ukraine).

He rarely acted in movies. He played in the films: "The Guilty Without Guilt" (1945), "Dead Souls" (1960, the governor), "War and Peace" (1967, Ilya Andreevich Rostov), in the Ukrainian film "The Third Strike" (1948, F. I. Tolbukhin, army general), etc.

The actor and director V. Stanytsyn's great contribution to cinema and theater was recognized by state awards.

He died on December 23, 1976 in Moscow. He was buried at the Vvedenskoye (German) Cemetery.

Selected filmography
 The Battle of Stalingrad (1949) as Winston Churchill / General Fedor Tolbukhin
 The Fall of Berlin (1950) as Winston Churchill
 The Lights of Baku (1950) as Winston Churchill
 The Unforgettable Year 1919 (1951) as Winston Churchill
 Anna Karenina (1953) as Prince Stepan Arkadyevich Oblonsky
 Dead Souls (1960) as Governor

Stanitsyn's last cinematic role was of Ilya Rostov, in the four-part film series War and Peace (1966–67), directed by Sergei Bondarchuk.

References

Bibliography
 Riley, John. Dmitri Shostakovich: A Life in Film.  Tauris, 2005.

External links

1897 births
1976 deaths
Ukrainian male film actors
Actors from Dnipro
People's Artists of the USSR
People's Artists of the RSFSR
Honored Artists of the RSFSR
Communist Party of the Soviet Union members
Academic staff of Moscow Art Theatre School